Kenneth M. Walsh is an American politician serving as a member of the Montana House of Representatives from the 71st district. Elected in November 2020, he assumed office on January 4, 2021.

Early life and education 
Walsh was born in Stockton, California. He earned a bachelor's and master's degree from Montana State University.

Career 
Prior to entering politics, Walsh was the CEO of Ruby Valley Bank. He was also the manager of the Northern International Livestock Exposition and Rodeo. Walsh was elected to the Montana House of Representatives in November 2020 and assumed office on January 4, 2021. Walsh lives in Twin Bridges, Montana.

References 

Living people
People from Stockton, California
Montana State University alumni
Republican Party members of the Montana House of Representatives
1954 births